Shortness of breath (SOB), also medically known as dyspnea (in AmE) or dyspnoea (in BrE), is an uncomfortable feeling of not being able to breathe well enough. The American Thoracic Society defines it as "a subjective experience of breathing discomfort that consists of qualitatively distinct sensations that vary in intensity", and recommends evaluating dyspnea by assessing the intensity of its distinct sensations, the degree of distress and discomfort involved, and its burden or impact on the patient's activities of daily living. Distinct sensations include effort/work to breathe, chest tightness or pain, and "air hunger" (the feeling of not enough oxygen). The tripod position is often assumed to be a sign.

Dyspnea is a normal symptom of heavy physical exertion but becomes pathological if it occurs in unexpected situations, when resting or during light exertion. In 85% of cases it is due to asthma, pneumonia, cardiac ischemia, interstitial lung disease, congestive heart failure, chronic obstructive pulmonary disease, or psychogenic causes, such as panic disorder and anxiety.  The best treatment to relieve or even remove shortness of breath typically depends on the underlying cause.

Definition
Dyspnea, in medical terms, is "shortness of breath".
The American Thoracic Society defines dyspnea as: "A subjective experience of breathing discomfort that consists of qualitatively distinct sensations that vary in intensity." Other definitions also describe it as "difficulty in breathing", "disordered or inadequate breathing",  "uncomfortable awareness of breathing", and as the experience of "breathlessness" (which may be either acute or chronic).

Differential diagnosis

While shortness of breath is generally caused by disorders of the cardiac or respiratory system, others such as the neurological, musculoskeletal, endocrine, hematologic, and psychiatric systems may be the cause. DiagnosisPro, an online medical expert system, listed 497 distinct causes in October 2010. The most common cardiovascular causes are acute myocardial infarction and congestive heart failure while common pulmonary causes include chronic obstructive pulmonary disease, asthma, pneumothorax, pulmonary edema and pneumonia. On a pathophysiological basis the causes can be divided into: (1) an increased awareness of normal breathing such as during an anxiety attack, (2) an increase in the work of breathing and (3) an abnormality in the ventilatory or respiratory system.

The tempo of onset and the duration of dyspnea are useful in knowing the etiology of dyspnea. Acute shortness of breath is usually connected with sudden physiological changes, such as laryngeal edema, bronchospasm, myocardial infarction, pulmonary embolism, or pneumothorax. Patients with COPD and idiopathic pulmonary fibrosis (IPF) have a mild onset and gradual progression of dyspnea on exertion, punctuated by acute exacerbations of shortness of breath. In contrast, most asthmatics do not have daily symptoms, but have intermittent episodes of dyspnea, cough, and chest tightness that are usually associated with specific triggers, such as an upper respiratory tract infection or exposure to allergens.

Acute coronary syndrome
Acute coronary syndrome frequently presents with retrosternal chest discomfort and difficulty catching the breath. It however may atypically present with shortness of breath alone. Risk factors include old age, smoking, hypertension, hyperlipidemia, and diabetes. An electrocardiogram and cardiac enzymes are important both for diagnosis and directing treatment. Treatment involves measures to decrease the oxygen requirement of the heart and efforts to increase blood flow.

COVID-19

People that have been infected by COVID-19 may have symptoms such as a fever, dry cough, loss of smell and taste, and in moderate to severe cases, shortness of breath.

Congestive heart failure
Congestive heart failure frequently presents with shortness of breath with exertion, orthopnea, and paroxysmal nocturnal dyspnea.  It affects between 1–2% of the general United States population and occurs in 10% of those over 65 years old. Risk factors for acute decompensation include high dietary salt intake, medication noncompliance, cardiac ischemia, abnormal heart rhythms, kidney failure, pulmonary emboli, hypertension, and infections. Treatment efforts are directed towards decreasing lung congestion.

Chronic obstructive pulmonary disease
People with chronic obstructive pulmonary disease (COPD), most commonly emphysema or chronic bronchitis, frequently have chronic shortness of breath and a chronic productive cough. An acute exacerbation presents with increased shortness of breath and sputum production. COPD is a risk factor for pneumonia; thus this condition should be ruled out. In an acute exacerbation treatment is with a combination of anticholinergics, beta2-adrenoceptor agonists, steroids and possibly positive pressure ventilation.

Asthma
Asthma is the most common reason for presenting to the emergency room with shortness of breath. It is the most common lung disease in both developing and developed countries affecting about 5% of the population. Other symptoms include wheezing, tightness in the chest, and a non productive cough.
Inhaled corticosteroids are the preferred treatment for children, however these drugs can reduce the growth rate. Acute symptoms are treated with short-acting bronchodilators.

Pneumothorax

Pneumothorax presents typically with pleuritic chest pain of acute onset and shortness of breath not improved with oxygen. Physical findings may include absent breath sounds on one side of the chest, jugular venous distension, and tracheal deviation.

Pneumonia
The symptoms of pneumonia are fever, productive cough, shortness of breath, and pleuritic chest pain. Inspiratory crackles may be heard on exam. A chest x-ray can be useful to differentiate pneumonia from congestive heart failure. As the cause is usually a bacterial infection, antibiotics are typically used for treatment.

Pulmonary embolism
Pulmonary embolism classically presents with an acute onset of shortness of breath. Other presenting symptoms include pleuritic chest pain, cough, hemoptysis, and fever. Risk factors include deep vein thrombosis, recent surgery, cancer, and previous thromboembolism. It must always be considered in those with acute onset of shortness of breath owing to its high risk of mortality. Diagnosis, however, may be difficult and Wells Score is often used to assess the clinical probability.  Treatment, depending on severity of symptoms, typically starts with anticoagulants; the presence of ominous signs (low blood pressure) may warrant the use of thrombolytic drugs.

Anemia
Anemia that develops gradually usually presents with exertional dyspnea, fatigue, weakness, and tachycardia. It may lead to heart failure. Anaemia is often a cause of dyspnea.  Menstruation, particularly if excessive, can contribute to anaemia and to consequential dyspnea in women. Headaches are also a symptom of dyspnea in patients with anaemia. Some patients report a numb sensation in their head, and others have reported blurred vision caused by hypotension behind the eye due to a lack of oxygen and pressure; these patients have also reported severe head pains, many of which lead to permanent brain damage. Symptoms can include loss of concentration, focus, fatigue, language faculty impairment and memory loss.

Cancer 
Shortness of breath is common in people with cancer and may be caused by numerous different factors. In people with advanced cancer, periods of time with severe shortness of breath may occur, along with a more continuous feeling of breathlessness.

Other
Other important or common causes of shortness of breath include cardiac tamponade, anaphylaxis, interstitial lung disease, panic attacks, and pulmonary hypertension. Also, around 2/3 of women experience shortness of breath as a part of a normal pregnancy.

Cardiac tamponade presents with dyspnea, tachycardia, elevated jugular venous pressure, and pulsus paradoxus. The gold standard for diagnosis is ultrasound.

Anaphylaxis typically begins over a few minutes in a person with a previous history of the same. Other symptoms include urticaria, throat swelling, and gastrointestinal upset. The primary treatment is epinephrine.

Interstitial lung disease presents with gradual onset of shortness of breath typically with a history of a predisposing environmental exposure. Shortness of breath is often the only symptom in those with tachydysrhythmias.

Panic attacks typically present with hyperventilation, sweating, and numbness. They are however a diagnosis of exclusion.

Neurological conditions such as spinal cord injury, phrenic nerve injuries, Guillain–Barré syndrome, amyotrophic lateral sclerosis, multiple sclerosis and muscular dystrophy can all cause an individual to experience shortness of breath. Shortness of breath can also occur as a result of vocal cord dysfunction (VCD).

Sarcoidosis is an inflammatory disease of unknown etiology that generally presents with dry cough, fatigue, and shortness of breath, although multiple organ systems may be affected, with involvement of sites such as the eyes, the skin and the joints.

Pathophysiology
Different physiological pathways may lead to shortness of breath including via ASIC chemoreceptors, mechanoreceptors, and lung receptors.

It is thought that three main components contribute to dyspnea: afferent signals, efferent signals, and central information processing. It is believed the central processing in the brain compares the afferent and efferent signals; and dyspnea results when a "mismatch" occurs between the two: such as when the need for ventilation (afferent signaling) is not being met by physical breathing (efferent signaling).

Afferent signals are sensory neuronal signals that ascend to the brain. Afferent neurons significant in dyspnea arise from a large number of sources including the carotid bodies, medulla, lungs, and chest wall. Chemoreceptors in the carotid bodies and medulla supply information regarding the blood gas levels of O2, CO2  and H+. In the lungs, juxtacapillary (J) receptors are sensitive to pulmonary interstitial edema, while stretch receptors signal bronchoconstriction. Muscle spindles in the chest wall signal the stretch and tension of the respiratory muscles. Thus, poor ventilation leading to hypercapnia, left heart failure leading to interstitial edema (impairing gas exchange), asthma causing bronchoconstriction (limiting airflow) and muscle fatigue leading to ineffective respiratory muscle action could all contribute to a feeling of dyspnea.

Efferent signals are the motor neuronal signals descending to the respiratory muscles. The most important respiratory muscle is the diaphragm. Other respiratory muscles include the external and internal intercostal muscles, the abdominal muscles and the accessory breathing muscles.

As the brain receives its plentiful supply of afferent information relating to ventilation, it is able to compare it to the current level of respiration as determined by the efferent signals. If the level of respiration is inappropriate for the body's status then dyspnea might occur. There is also a psychological component to dyspnea, as some people may become aware of their breathing in such circumstances but not experience the typical distress of dyspnea.

Diagnosis

The initial approach to evaluation begins by assessment of the airway, breathing, and circulation followed by a medical history and physical examination. Signs and symptoms that represent significant severity include hypotension, hypoxemia, tracheal deviation, altered mental status, unstable dysrhythmia, stridor, intercostal indrawing, cyanosis, tripod positioning, pronounced use of accessory muscles (sternocleidomastoid, scalenes) and absent breath sounds.

A number of scales may be used to quantify the degree of shortness of breath. It may be subjectively rated on a scale from 1 to 10 with descriptors associated with the number (The Modified Borg Scale). The MRC breathlessness scale suggests five grades of dyspnea based on the circumstances and severity in which it arises.

Blood tests
A number of labs may be helpful in determining the cause of shortness of breath. D-dimer, while useful to rule out a pulmonary embolism in those who are at low risk, is not of much value if it is positive, as it may be positive in a number of conditions that lead to shortness of breath. A low level of brain natriuretic peptide is useful in ruling out congestive heart failure; however, a high level, while supportive of the diagnosis, could also be due to advanced age, kidney failure, acute coronary syndrome, or a large pulmonary embolism.

Imaging
A chest x-ray is useful to confirm or rule out a pneumothorax, pulmonary edema, or pneumonia. Spiral computed tomography with intravenous radiocontrast is the imaging study of choice to evaluate for pulmonary embolism.

Treatment
The primary treatment of shortness of breath is directed at its underlying cause. Extra supplemental oxygen is effective in those with hypoxia; however, this has no effect in those with normal blood oxygen saturations.

Physiotherapy
Individuals can benefit from a variety of physical therapy interventions. Persons with neurological/neuromuscular abnormalities may have breathing difficulties due to weak or paralyzed intercostal, abdominal and/or other muscles needed for ventilation. Some physical therapy interventions for this population include active assisted cough techniques, volume augmentation such as breath stacking, education about body position and ventilation patterns and movement strategies to facilitate breathing.  Pulmonary rehabilitation may alleviate symptoms in some people, such as those with COPD, but will not cure the underlying disease. Fan therapy to the face has been shown to relieve shortness of breath in patients with a variety of advanced illnesses including cancer. The mechanism of action is thought to be stimulation of the trigeminal nerve.

Palliative medicine
Systemic immediate release opioids are beneficial in emergently reducing the symptom severity of shortness of breath due to both cancer and non cancer causes; long-acting/sustained-release opioids are also used to prevent/continue treatment of dyspnea in palliative setting. There is a lack of evidence to recommend midazolam, nebulised opioids, the use of gas mixtures, or cognitive-behavioral therapy yet.

Non-pharmacological techniques 
Non-pharmacological interventions provide key tools for the management of breathlessness. Potentially beneficial approaches include active management of psychosocial issues (anxiety, depression, etc.), and implementation of self-management strategies, such as physical and mental relaxation techniques, pacing techniques, energy conservation techniques, learning exercises to control breathing, and education. The use of a fan may possibly be beneficial. Cognitive behavioural therapy may also be helpful.

Pharmacological treatment 
For people with severe, chronic, or uncontrollable breathlessness, non-pharmacological approaches to treating breathlessness may be combined with medication. For people who have cancer that is causing the breathlessness, medications that have been suggested include opioids, benzodiazepines, oxygen, and steroids. Results of recent systematic reviews and meta-analyses found opioids were not necessarily associated with more effectiveness in treatment for patients with advanced cancer.

Ensuring that the balance between side effects and adverse effects from medications and potential improvements from medications needs to be carefully considered before prescribing medication. The use of systematic corticosteriods in palliative care for people with cancer is common, however the effectiveness and potential adverse effects of this approach in adults with cancer has not been well studied.

Epidemiology
Shortness of breath is the primary reason 3.5% of people present to the emergency department in the United States. Of these individuals, approximately 51% are admitted to the hospital and 13% are dead within a year. Some studies have suggested that up to 27% of hospitalized people develop dyspnea, while in dying patients 75% will experience it. Acute shortness of breath is the most common reason people requiring palliative care visit an emergency department. Up to 70% of adults with advanced cancer also experience dyspnoea.

Etymology and pronunciation
English dyspnea comes from Latin dyspnoea, from Greek dyspnoia, from dyspnoos, which literally means "disordered breathing". Its combining forms (dys- + -pnea) are familiar from other medical words, such as dysfunction (dys- + function) and apnea (a- + -pnea). But pronunciations with a silent p in pn (as also in pneumo-) are common ( or ), as are those with the stress on the first syllable ( or ).

In English, the various -pnea-suffixed words commonly used in medicine do not follow one clear pattern as to whether the /niː/ syllable or the one preceding it is stressed; the p is usually expressed but is sometimes silent depending on the word. The following collation or list shows the preponderance of how major dictionaries pronounce and transcribe them (less-used variants are omitted):

See also
 List of terms of lung size and activity
 Bronchospasm
 Orthopnea

References

External links
Shortness Of Breath (Dyspnea)StatPearls

Breathing abnormalities